Marina Šur Puhlovski is a Croatian writer. She was born and raised in Zagreb, and studied comparative literature and philosophy at university. She writes in a wide range of genres, including short stories, novels, travelogues and essays. Her debut novel Trojan Horse appeared in 1991. Her recent novel Wild Woman received critical acclaim and was translated into English by the prolific translator Christina Pribichevich Zorić.

In 2015 she won the Zvane Črnja Award for her book Književnost me iznevjerila: (Eseji s margine)..

References

Croatian writers
Living people
Year of birth missing (living people)